Don, Donnie, or Donald May may refer to:

Donald May (1929–2022), American actor
Don May (politician) (1924–2001), Australian state legislator
Don May (basketball) (born 1946), American small forward
Donnie May (born 1966), Canadian stock car racer in Emo Speedway Championships
Don May, Jr. (born 1967), American producer of video documentaries, founder of Synapse Films

See also
 May (surname)